After previously stating that he would not run for re-election, Jason Chaffetz announced on May 19 that he was resigning his seat in the House, effective June 30. A special election was called to replace him with a filing period opening on May 19 and closing by June 30, an expected primary date of August 15, and an election day of November 7.

A crowded field of candidates emerged to compete for spots in their respective parties' primaries.  15 Republicans, 4 Democrats, 2 Independent American Party members and 1 Libertarian declared their candidacy. Candidates could qualify for the primary ballot by either being nominated by delegates at their party's convention or gathering 7,000 signatures from registered voters. Those gathering signatures could also seek nomination at their party's convention. The Republican and Democratic parties held conventions June 17 to select a nominee from the declared.

The primary election to determine the Republican Party's candidate for the general election was held on August 15. In addition to the partisan candidates, one unaffiliated candidate appeared on the general election ballot and two candidates ran as a write-in.

The general election was held on Tuesday, November 7, 2017. Republican John Curtis was declared the winner and was subsequently seated by the U.S. House for a term that ends January 3, 2019.

Republican primary
The Republican primary was held on Tuesday August 15, 2017. Only registered Republicans living in the 3rd congressional district were able vote in the primary, though unaffiliated voters were allowed to affiliate as Republicans at polling locations on election day.

Candidates
Fifteen candidates declared their candidacy for the Republican party nomination. While four candidates declared their intent to gather signatures, only two submitted signatures for verification by the required deadline. This election was the first time in Utah politics where three candidates were on the primary ballot since two candidates submitted enough signatures to qualify for the primary ballot and the party nominated a third candidate at its convention.

Nominated
 John Curtis, Mayor of Provo

Eliminated in primary
Tanner Ainge, son of Danny Ainge
 Chris Herrod, real estate developer, former state representative and candidate for the U.S. Senate in 2012

Ainge and Curtis submitted enough signatures to qualify for spots on the primary ballot.  Curtis also participated in the convention process, but lost to Herrod who was nominated at the convention. Curtis would go on to win the primary.

Lost at convention
 Debbie Aldrich
 Brad Daw, state representative
 Margaret Dayton, state senator
 Paul David Fife
 Deidre Henderson, state senator
Damian Kidd, attorney
 Keith Kuder
 Stewart Peay, attorney
 Shayne Horton Row

Withdrawn before convention
 Jeremy Lewis Friedbaum
 Mike Leavitt, not to be confused with former Utah Governor Mike Leavitt

Failed to qualify for primary via signature gathering process
Brigham Rhead Cottam

Convention results

Endorsements

Polling
{| class="wikitable"
|- valign= bottom
! style="width:255px;"| Poll source
! style="width:160px;"| Date(s)administered
! class=small | Samplesize
! class=small | Margin oferror
! style="width:100px;"| John Curtis (R)
! style="width:100px;"| Chris Herrod (R)
! style="width:100px;"| Tanner Ainge (R)
! Undecided
|-
| Dan Jones & Associates
| align=center| June 23 – July 5, 2017
| align=center| 199
| align=center| 4.9%
|  align=center| 27%
| align=center| 9%
| align=center| 7%
| align=center| 57%

Primary results

Democratic Party
Four candidates declared their candidacy for the Democratic party nomination. Two candidates declared their intent to gather signatures but neither submitted signatures for verification prior to the required deadline. On June 17, 2017, the Democratic Party formally nominated Kathie Allen as their candidate, eliminating the need for a primary election.

Candidates

Nominated
 Kathie Allen, physician

Lost at convention
 Carl Ingwell, biologist
 Ben Frank, activist

Withdrawn before convention
 Faeiza Javed

Convention results

Third-party and independent candidates

United Utah Party
The newly formed United Utah Party submitted the required number of signatures to be recognized as a political party in Utah on May 25, one day before the candidate filing deadline. Jim Bennett, the party's executive director, filed to run as its nominee but was rejected because the state had not yet processed the submitted signatures.

The party took the issue to court, and a federal judge found that Utah had illegally violated Bennett's First and Fourteenth Amendment rights by denying him a spot on the ballot. The state elections office immediately complied with the court order and declined to appeal the decision. Jim Bennett was placed on the general election ballot as the United Utah Party candidate.

Nominee
 Jim Bennett, executive director of the United Utah Party and son of former U.S. Senator Bob Bennett

Independent American Party

Candidates
Two candidates declared their intent to seek the nomination of the Independent American Party.

Nominated
 Jason Christensen

Lost at convention
 Aaron Heineman

Libertarian Party

Nominee
 Joe Buchman

Independents
 Sean Whalen

Write-in candidates
 Brendan Phillips
 Russell Paul Roesler

General election
The special general election was held on Tuesday, November 7, 2017.

Candidates 
Major

The following candidates qualified to appear in the state-sponsored debates:
 John Curtis (Republican), Mayor of Provo
 Kathie Allen (Democratic), physician
 Jim Bennett (United Utah), son of former U.S. Senator Bob Bennett, grandson of former U.S. Senator Wallace F. Bennett. Bennett is the first third party candidate in history to cross the threshold to appear in the official debate commission debate.

Minor

The following third-party or independent candidates qualified for the ballot but didn't poll high enough to currently qualify for the state-sponsored debates:
 Joe Buchman (Libertarian)
 Jason Christensen (Independent American)
 Sean Whalen (Independent)

Predictions

Endorsements

Polling

Results

By county

References

External links
 Kathie Allen for Congress (D)
 Jim Bennett for Congress (UUP)
 Joe Buchman for Congress (L)
 Jason Christensen for Congress (IA)
 John Curtis for Congress (R)
 Sean Whalen for Congress (I)

Utah 2017 03
Utah 2017 03
2017 03 Special
Utah 03 Special
United States House of Representatives 03 Special
United States House of Representatives 2017 03
2017